Vineland is a census-designated place (CDP) in and governed by Pueblo County, Colorado, United States. The CDP is a part of the Pueblo, CO Metropolitan Statistical Area. The population of the Vineland CDP was 251 at the United States Census 2010. The Pueblo post office  serves the area.

Geography
Vineland is just east of the St. Charles River on East US Highway 50 (Business), sometimes called Santa Fe. The area is known in for its family-operated vegetable farms.

Demographics

Education
Vineland is served by the Pueblo County School District 70. It is the home of Pueblo County High School, Vineland Elementary School, and Vineland Middle School.

See also

 List of census-designated places in Colorado

References

External links

 Vineland @ Colorado.com
 Vineland @ UncoverColorado.com
 Pueblo County Rural School District 70
 Pueblo County High School
 Vineland Middle School
 Vineland Elementary School
 Pueblo County website

Census-designated places in Pueblo County, Colorado
Census-designated places in Colorado